Tom McNab (July 15, 1933 – April 5, 2006) is a former association football player who represented New Zealand at international level.

McNab, who captained and Auckland select side against visiting Manchester United in 1967, made his full All Whites debut in a 3–5 loss to Australia on 5  November 1967 and ended his international playing career with five A-international caps to his credit, his final cap an appearance in a 0–0 draw New Caledonia on 25 July 1969.

Following his retirement from football, McNab was injured in a workplace accident and spent the remainder of his life in a wheelchair. He died on 5 April 2006, aged 72.

References 

New Zealand association footballers
New Zealand international footballers
1933 births
2006 deaths
Footballers from Glasgow
Baillieston Juniors F.C. players
Scottish Junior Football Association players
Partick Thistle F.C. players
Nottingham Forest F.C. players
Wrexham A.F.C. players
Barrow A.F.C. players
East Stirlingshire F.C. players
Eastern Suburbs AFC players
Metro F.C. players
Association football wing halves
Scottish emigrants to New Zealand